Al-Suqaylabiyah Subdistrict  is a Syrian nahiyah (subdistrict) located in Al-Suqaylabiyah District in Hama.  According to the Syria Central Bureau of Statistics (CBS), al-Suqaylabiyah Subdistrict had a population of 49,686 in the 2004 census.

References 

Suqaylabiyah
Al-Suqaylabiyah District